Freybug is a monstrous Black Dog that is stated to come from medieval English folklore, specifically from Norfolk. Like most supernatural black dogs, it was roughly the size of a calf, and wandered country roads terrifying travelers.

The English martyr Laurence Saunders mentioned Fray-bugs in his letters to his wife in 1555. The word Fray-bug is defined by the Oxford English Dictionary as “an object of fear; a bogy, spectre.” The similar word “fray-boggart” was a word for a scarecrow. Popular Antiquities of Great Britain, by John Brand, referenced Saunders' letters and suggested that the Fray-bug was a Black Dog similar to the Barghest. Carol Rose seems to have drawn on Brand’s work for her description of the Freybug.

Resources

References

Mythological dogs
English legendary creatures